Chabilal Upadhyaya was born on 12 May 1882 at Budhigang (Undivided Darrang) present day Biswanath district, was the first (selected) president of the Assam Pradesh Congress committee. In 1919 Upadhyaya's family settled at Mazgaon (Gongmouthan), Behali Tehsil.

Political contributions
Chabilal Upadhyaya, popularly known as Chabilal Babu was a prominent leader of the Indian Freedom Movement from Assam.Upadhyaya joined the war of independence. On April 18, 1921, a meeting chaired by Upadhyaya was held in jorhat where the Assam Association was merged with Indian National Congress to form Assam Pradesh Congress Committee. He became the first (selected) president of the Assam Pradesh Congress committee. He was arrested by the British for joining the Congress and paid a jail term of six months by joining the Non-Cooperation movement under Gandhiji's leadership.

Upadhyaya played an important role in establishing various local schools in Gohpur Sub-division.  Under his leadership, thirty thousand Nepali speaking people protested against Jinnah's proposal at the call of All India Gorkha League.

Now, Government of Assam announced that an engineering college will be established in Behali, Assam which will be named after Chabilal Upadhyaya.

See also 
 Assam Pradesh Congress Committee
 Kuladhar Chaliha
 Indian National Congress
 Biswanath District

References

External links

1882 births
1980 deaths
Assam
Indian politicians
Indian Gorkhas
People from Darrang district
People from British India